Dobričić is an ancient red wine grape variety from the island of Šolta off the Dalmatian coast in Croatia. Some areas still grow Dobričić – many vineyards were left to grow wild following World War II.

Ancestry 
It is one parent of the Plavac Mali red wine grape variety; the other one is Zinfandel, a grape variety also known as Crljenak Kaštelanski in Croatia, from where it originates.

Agriculture 
Historically, it was prone to mold, while Crljenak was prone to be overly heat sensitive, thus the cross of Plavac Mali resulted in a grape that had neither of these negative attributes and was perfect for the region.

See also
Croatian wine
Zinfandel
Plavac Mali

References

Grape varieties of Croatia
Dalmatian grape varieties
Red wine grape varieties
Wine grapes of Croatia